The 1892 Florida gubernatorial election was held on October 4, 1892. Democratic nominee Henry L. Mitchell defeated People's Party nominee Alonzo P. Baskin with 78.70% of the vote.

General election

Candidates
Major party candidates
Henry L. Mitchell, Democratic, Florida Supreme Court Justice and former State Representative.

Other candidates
 Alonzo P. Baskin (People's), former member of the Florida House of Representatives.
 N. J. Hawley, Prohibition

Results

References

1892
Florida
Gubernatorial